Mackrory is a surname. Notable people with the surname include:
Cherilyn Mackrory, British Member of Parliament elected 2019
Lawrence Mackrory, singer with Swedish bands Darkane and Andromeda

See also
McRory
Mac Ruaidhrí